Martorana is a surname. Notable people with the surname include:

Bernardo Martorana (1846–after 1891), Italian painter
Gioacchino Martorana (1736–1779), Italian painter, son of Pietro
Pietro Martorana (1705–1759), Italian painter